Szaflary  is a village in southern Poland situated in the Lesser Poland Voivodeship since 1999 (it was previously in Nowy Sącz Voivodeship from 1975 to 1998). Szaflary has about 2,200 residents. There is a church, a fire station, and a few grocery stores in the village. The village lies along the Dunajec River.

See also

Zakopianka
Nowy Targ
Zakopane

Villages in Nowy Targ County